Dendrophilinae is a subfamily of clown beetles in the family Histeridae. There are more than 30 genera and 490 described species in Dendrophilinae.

Genera
These 33 genera belong to the subfamily Dendrophilinae:

 Abraeomorphus Reitter, 1886
 Africanister Gomy, 2010
 Anapleus Horn, 1873
 Antongilus Gomy, 1969
 Athomalus Mazur, 1993
 Australanius Gomy, 2009
 Australomalus Mazur, 1981
 Bacaniomorphus Mazur, 1989
 Bacanius J. L. LeConte, 1853
 Carcinops Marseul, 1855
 Chaetobacanius Gomy, 1977
 Coomanister Kryzhanovskij, 1972
 Cryptomalus Mazur, 1993
 Cyclobacanius G. Müller, 1925
 Degallierister Gomy, 2001
 Dendrophilus Leach, 1817
 Diplostix Bickhardt, 1921
 Eulomalus Cooman, 1937
 Eutriptus Wollaston, 1862
 Geocolus Wenzel, 1944
 Globodiplostix Vienna & Yélamos, 2006
 Indodiplostix Vienna, 2007
 Juliettinus Gomy, 2010
 Kissister Marseul, 1862
 Mullerister Cooman, 1936
 Neobacanius G. Müller, 1925
 Pachylomalus Schmidt, 1897
 Paromalus Erichson, 1834
 Platylomalus Cooman, 1948
 Sardulus Patrizi, 1955
 Triballodes Schmidt, 1885
 Troglobacanius Vomero, 1974
 Xestipyge Marseul, 1862

References

Further reading

External links

 

Histeridae